Nucras aurantiaca, the Lambert's Bay sandveld lizard, is a wall lizard in the family of true lizards (Lacertidae). It is found in South Africa.

References 

Nucras
Lacertid lizards of Africa
Reptiles described in 2019